Anzor Bolkvadze (born 9 September 1960) is a Georgian politician. Member of Parliament of Georgia since 2008.

Biography
 Head of Service of Khulo Governor's Board (2007)
 Head of Service of Khulo Municipality Board (2006 - 2007)
 Head of the Group of Ajara Maintenance-Mantle Board (1985 - 1994)
 Worker of Moving Mechanical Column (1982 - 1985)
 Soviet Army (1980 - 1982)
 Taskmaster of “Sakkoopremontspetsmsheni” (1980)

References

External links
 Parliament of Georgia

1960 births
Living people
Members of the Parliament of Georgia